Jacob Daniel Faria (born July 30, 1993) is an American professional baseball pitcher in the Boston Red Sox organization. He previously played in Major League Baseball (MLB) for the Tampa Bay Rays, Milwaukee Brewers, and Arizona Diamondbacks.

Amateur career
Faria attended Gahr High School in Cerritos, California. He committed to play college baseball at Cal State Fullerton.

Professional career

Draft and minor leagues 
The Tampa Bay Rays selected Faria in the 10th round of the 2011 Major League Baseball draft. He made his professional debut with the Gulf Coast Rays. Faria played 2012 and 2013 with the Princeton Rays. He pitched 2014 with the Bowling Green Hot Rods and started 2015 with the Charlotte Stone Crabs. After going 10–1 with a 1.33 earned run average (ERA) in 12 games, he was promoted to the Double-A Montgomery Biscuits. In his second start with Montgomery tied a team record with 14 strikeouts over seven no-hit innings. Faria started 2016 with Montgomery and was called to the Durham Bulls in June. Entering the 2017 season, Faria was considered by Baseball America to be the 8th best prospect in the Rays farm system. He started the season with the Bulls, and was promoted to the Rays on June 6.

Tampa Bay Rays 
On June 7, 2017, exactly six years after being drafted, Faria made his MLB debut against the Chicago White Sox. Faria allowed one run on three hits in  innings, getting the win and snapping a four-game losing streak. He became the ninth pitcher in history to start his career with seven or more quality starts. Faria ended the 2017 season with a 3.43 ERA in 16 games.

Faria started the 2018 season as the number three starter for Tampa Bay. On May 23, 2018, Faria was put on the 60-Day DL with an oblique strain, he had recorded an ERA of 5.48 in  innings before the injury. Faria returned on August 1, where he threw  innings and earned the win in relief against the Los Angeles Angels. On August 16, Faria was opted down to Triple-A Durham to make room for Tommy Pham, he was 4–3 with a 4.84 ERA. He was recalled on September 5. He began the 2018 season in the Rays rotation before landing on the disabled list on May 23 with an oblique injury. He finished the season making 17 appearances, 12 starts. He was 4–4 with a 5.40 ERA in 65 innings pitched.

Milwaukee Brewers
On July 31, 2019, the Rays traded Faria to the Milwaukee Brewers for Jesús Aguilar. Faria was designated for assignment on January 10, 2020, and outrighted on January 21. Faria did not play in a game in 2020 due to the cancellation of the minor league season because of the COVID-19 pandemic. Faria was released by the Brewers organization on September 18, 2020.

Los Angeles Angels
On December 6, 2020, Faria signed a minor league contract with the Los Angeles Angels organization. He was assigned to the Triple-A Salt Lake Bees to begin the 2021 season. In 7 appearances for Salt Lake, he recorded a 3–2 record and 5.65 ERA before being opting out of his minor league contract on June 15, 2021.

Arizona Diamondbacks
On June 19, 2021, Faria signed a major league contract with the Arizona Diamondbacks.
Faria made 23 appearances for Arizona in 2021, recording a 5.51 ERA with 32 strikeouts. On September 19, the Diamondbacks designated Faria for assignment.
On September 22, Faria elected free agency.

Minnesota Twins
On December 1, 2021, Faria signed a minor league contract with the Minnesota Twins. He was assigned to the Triple-A St. Paul Saints to begin the 2022 season. He struggled largely in 12 games (9 starts) for the team, recording a 1-2 record and 7.48 ERA with 39 strikeouts in 43.1 innings pitched. He was released by the organization on June 22, 2022.

Boston Red Sox
On February 4, 2023, Faria signed a minor league contract with the Boston Red Sox organization.

Personal life
Faria and his girlfriend, Jessica Soto, became engaged in May 2017. The couple were married on November 16, 2018, in California. Faria is of Portuguese and Cuban descent.

References

External links

1993 births
Living people
People from Anaheim, California
Baseball players from California
Major League Baseball pitchers
Tampa Bay Rays players
Milwaukee Brewers players
Arizona Diamondbacks players
Gulf Coast Rays players
Princeton Rays players
Bowling Green Hot Rods players
Charlotte Stone Crabs players
Montgomery Biscuits players
Durham Bulls players
San Antonio Missions players
Salt Lake Bees players
American people of Portuguese descent